Bufonaria margaritula is a species of sea snail, a marine gastropod mollusk in the family Bursidae, the frog shells.

Alternative combinations: 
Bufonaria margaritula, Bursa (Bursa) margaritula, Bursa margaritula, Chasmotheca margaritula,

Parent taxon: Bufonaria (Bufonaria) according to A. G. Beu 2005

Distribution
This marine species occurs off the Malabar Coast.

References

 Kilburn R.N. (1972). Taxonomic notes on South African marine Mollusca, with the description of new species and subspecies of Conus, Nassarius, Vexillum and Demoulia. Annals of the Natal Museum 21(2):391-437
 Liu, J.Y. [Ruiyu] (ed.). (2008). Checklist of marine biota of China seas. China Science Press. 1267 pp
 Steyn, D.G & Lussi, M. (2005). Offshore Shells of Southern Africa: A pictorial guide to more than 750 Gastropods. Published by the authors. Pp. i–vi, 1–289.

External links
 Deshayes G.P. (1832-1833). Mollusques. In: Bélanger, C. (ed.) Voyage aux Indes-Orientales, par le nord de l'Europe, les provinces du Caucase, la Géorgie, l'Arménie et la Perse, suivi de détails topographiques, statistiques et autres sur le Pégou, les îles de Java, de Maurice et de Bourbon, sur le Cap-de-Bonne-Espérance et Sainte-Hélène, pendant les années 1825, 1826, 1827, 1828 et 1829. Volume 2, Zoologie: 403-416 [1832, 417-440 [1833], 3 pls [1833 or 1834]. Paris: Arthus Bertrand.]

Bursidae
Gastropods described in 1832